Kessleria insubrica is a moth of the family Yponomeutidae. It is found in Italy.

The length of the forewings is 7.5–8 mm for males and 6.5-7.4 mm for females. The forewings are white with brown and ochre sprinkling. The hindwings are light grey. Adults are on wing from the beginning of June to the end of August.

The larvae feed on Saxifraga caesia. They live in a spinning (a shelter like the web of a spider).

References

Moths described in 1993
Yponomeutidae
Endemic fauna of Italy
Moths of Europe